Ichamati district is a proposed district in presidency division, West Bengal. The district will be carved out of the existing North 24 Parganas district.

History 

On 1 August 2022, Chief Minister of West Bengal Mamata Banerjee declared the creation of Ichamati district craving out from North 24 Parganas district. The new district will cover the area of Bangaon subdivision.

Education

University
 Harichand Guruchand University

College
 Dinabandhu Mahavidyalay
 Nahata Jogendranath Mandal Smriti Mahavidyalaya
 P. R. Thakur Government College
 Dr. B. R. Ambedkar Satabarshiki Mahavidyalaya
 Gaighata Government Polytechnic

Schools
There are many primary, secondary and higher secondary schools in this district. Bongaon High School and Kumudini Uchcha Balika Vidyalaya are among the best schools in this area.

Health facilities 
The main hospital of Ichamati district is Dr. Jiban Ratan Dhar Subdivisional Hospital. It consists of 250 beds. Besides, this district has two rural hospitals with 30 beds each: Bagdah Rural Hospital and Chandpara Rural Hospital.

References

Proposed districts of West Bengal